Maria of Antioch ( 1220 – 1307) was a claimant to the throne of the Kingdom of Jerusalem from 1268 to 1277. In 1267 she laid claim to govern the kingdom as regent in the name of the absentee King Conrad III. Her legal case was solid, resting on the proximity of blood to the king, but she was rejected by the High Court of Jerusalem in favor of Hugh III of Cyprus. When Conrad died in 1268, she demanded to be crowned as his successor. Spurned yet again for Hugh, she moved to Europe and eventually sold her claim to Charles I of Anjou.

Family
Maria was born  1220. She was the daughter of Prince Bohemond IV of Antioch and his second wife, Melisende of Lusignan. Through her mother, Maria was the granddaughter of Queen Isabella I of Jerusalem and King Aimery of Cyprus. After the death of her mother's half-sister Alice of Champagne in 1246, Melisende put forward a claim to the regency of the Kingdom of Jerusalem as the closest relative of the minor and absent King Conrad II, but was rejected in favor of King Henry I of Cyprus, Alice's son. Maria's older half-brother Henry married Isabella, daughter of Alice and sister of Henry I of Cyprus, and the couple had a son, Hugh. Maria never married and had no children.

High Court cases
In the 1260s, the thrones of the kingdoms of Jerusalem and Cyprus were occupied by two underage kings, Conrad III and Hugh II, respectively. They were descended from Maria of Montferrat and Alice of Champagne, older half-sisters of Maria of Antioch's mother, respectively. Conrad lived in Europe, and so the regency of Jerusalem was nominally vested into Hugh II. But since Hugh II was a minor too, the regency was exercised first by his mother, Plaisance of Antioch, who died in 1261, and then by his aunt Isabella, who died in 1264. The right to exercise the regency of Jerusalem on behalf of the young king of Cyprus was then disputed between his cousins Hugh of Brienne and Isabella's son Hugh of Antioch, with the latter being selected by the High Court of Jerusalem.

Hugh II died in 1267, and was succeeded as king of Cyprus by Hugh of Antioch (Hugh III). In addition to the throne of Cyprus, Hugh III claimed the regency of the Kingdom of Jerusalem, and the High Court was prepared to accept him. But when he sailed in May 1268 to Acre, the capital of what remained of that Crusader state, he found his claim challenged by his aunt Maria, who was then in her forties. She asserted that the regency should belong to her because she was, by one degree, more closely related to the king of Jerusalem, Conrad III, and the only surviving grandchild of Isabella I. Her case was legally stronger than Hugh's. She delivered accurate information and had a carefully prepared deposition read for her. After hearing Hugh's spontaneous reply, she withdrew and did not return to hear the verdict. It appears that the High Court recognized the superiority of Maria's claim and used her absence to justify awarding the regency to Hugh, arguing that she was in default. In reality, Hugh was preferable because he had experience in government and his Cypriot troops could contribute to the defense of the dwindling kingdom against the Egyptian sultan Baibars. Maria, on the other hand, could offer them nothing. The acquisition of the regency marked Hugh as the heir presumptive to King Conrad.

Conrad was executed on the orders of Charles I of Anjou on 29 October 1268. Hugh duly became king of Jerusalem, but Maria continued to contest his title. She demanded that she be crowned by the Latin patriarch of Jerusalem, William of Agen, but he "scornfully dismissed" her claim and "considered it worthless". The Knights Templar supported her claim, possibly because they expected her to be a weak ruler or to sell the kingdom to Charles. A sale, rather than a wish to rule, may have been Maria's principal motivation for claiming the throne. Hugh's coronation, held in the cathedral at Tyre, was thus postponed until 24 September 1269. Maria had a clerk and a notary interrupt it with a protest on her behalf, after which they ran out of the cathedral. She appealed to the Templars for support before leaving the Holy Land and launching a long litigation at the Holy See in Rome.

Life in Europe
By 1270, Maria had come into contact with Charles. A ship carrying her goods sunk that year, prompting Charles to intervene for her. The loss may have caused lasting financial troubles for Maria. On 24 October 1272, Pope Gregory X authorised the archbishop of Nazareth and the bishops of Bethlehem and Banyas to investigate the succession dispute. Maria appeared at the Second Council of Lyons to present her claim again. The papal curia knew that her claim was better than Hugh's, but the cardinal bishop of Albano, Bonaventure, explained that only the barons of Jerusalem had the power to decide their monarch. Maria accepted the argument, possibly in 1276, and asked the judges to quash the case because she was too poor to proceed.

In March 1277, Maria sold her claim to Charles for annual payments of 4,000 livres tournois and 10,000 Saracen bezants from Acre. He claimed, probably falsely, that Maria's offer of the kingdom had been refused by many princes before he accepted. The sale was unprecedented and breached the kingdom's inheritance laws. After the sale, Charles promptly sent Roger of San Severino to occupy the kingdom for him. Roger arrived in Acre with credentials signed by Charles, Maria, and Pope John XXI. Frustrated by the opposition he faced, Hugh did not resist, but Charles was never universally accepted as king. Hugh's son Henry II regained Acre in 1285, but when the city fell to the Egyptian sultan Al Asraf Khalil in 1291, the Kingdom of Jerusalem was permanently destroyed. Maria's annuity was confirmed by Charles II, but it is doubtful if she did receive all the money. She died in 1307.

Genealogical table

References

Sources

 
 
 
 
 

13th-century births
1307 deaths
13th-century women
14th-century women
Women of the Crusader states
Year of birth unknown
Claimant Kings of Jerusalem
House of Poitiers